Epsom Athletic Football Club was a football club based in Chessington, England. They were affiliated to the Surrey County Football Association.

History
The club was established in 1997 by Paul Burstow and joined the Sutton & District League. In 1999–2000 they were Division Two runners-up and were promoted to Division One. The following season saw them finish second in Division One, earning a second straight promotion. The club then won the Premier Division at the first attempt. After switching to the Surrey South Eastern Combination, they finished as runners-up in Division Two in 2003–04 season and were promoted to Division One. In 2005–06 they won the League Cup, and the following season saw them end the season as Division One runners-up.

In 2008 Epsom were founder members of the Surrey Elite Intermediate League. They finished as league runners-up in 2010–11 but were refused promotion to the Combined Counties League. However, after winning the league the following season, and agreeing a groundshare with Chessington & Hook United, the club were promoted to Division One of the Combined Counties League. In their first season in the Combined Counties League the club made their debut in the FA Vase, losing 4–3 at home to Camberley Town. The following season saw them make their FA Cup debut, losing 3–1 at home to Croydon. After finishing bottom of Division One in 2016–17, the club were relegated back to Division One of the Surrey South Eastern Combination. They subsequently folded during the 2017–18 season

Honours
Surrey Elite Intermediate League
Champions 2011–12
Surrey South Eastern Combination
League Cup winners: 2005–06
Sutton & District League
Premier Division champions 2001–02

Records
Best FA Cup performance: Extra preliminary round, 2013–14, 2014–15
Best FA Vase performance: First round, 2013–14

References

External links
Official website

Defunct football clubs in England
Defunct football clubs in Surrey
Association football clubs established in 1997
1997 establishments in England
Epsom and Ewell
Surrey South Eastern Combination
Surrey Elite Intermediate Football League
Combined Counties Football League
2017 disestablishments in England
Association football clubs disestablished in 2017